The Burning of the Character "Big" (大), also known as Daimonjiyaki or Daimonji Festival is the Japanese Buddhist ritual of burning wood in the character "Big" (大), typically in the mountain, on the last day of the 4-day Bon Festival to send back to the other world the spirits of the family ancestors that they welcomed on the first day.

There are many locations in Japan where this ritual is held. In western Japan, the Okuribi of the Five Mountains, celebrated in Kyoto, is the most famous, while in eastern Japan, the ritual during the Hakone Gora Summer Festival with the fire burned on Mount Myōjō in the Hakone Mountains is relatively well known because of its proximity to Tokyo.

See also
Bon Festival
Farewell Fires of the Five Mountains in Kyoto
Sagichō Fire Festival

References

External link
Okuribi (Ceremonial Bonfire to Send out Spirits of the Dead) (送り火)

Annual events in Japan
Buddhist festivals in Japan
July observances
August observances
Bon Festival